Richard Stone  (born 9 March 1937) is a British medical doctor, social and campaigner and philanthropist. Stone is best known for his association with the Runnymede Trust and the Jewish Council for Racial Equality on issues of race and politics, as well as race and society more generally in the United Kingdom. Stone was appointed to the panel of the Stephen Lawrence inquiry; a case involving a Black teenager who was murdered in London in 1993; which eventually led to the Macpherson Report, which defined the British Metropolitan Police's response to the incident as "institutionally racist." Stone is also noted for his association with the Jewish interfaith group The Woolf Institute.

Anti-racism and inter-faith work 
Stone has worked as a political activist on issues of race and politics, as well as race and society in the United Kingdom. He has been in the campaign arising around the Stephen Lawrence murder after sitting on the panel of the Stephen Lawrence Inquiry. Stone served as a Cabinet Advisor to the Mayor of London, President of the Jewish Council for Racial Equality, and spent five years on the Runnymede Trust's ‘Commission on British Muslims and Islamophobia’, from 2000 to 2004 as chair. He has also been a trustee and vice-Chair of the Runnymede Trust and a Council and Board member of Liberty. For 14 years he was the chair of the Islamophobia Commission, set up by the Runnymede Trust in 1996, working with British Muslims.

He was a member of the Home Office's Working Groups on Tackling Extremism Together.

Much of his work has been to bring together British Jews and British Muslims. He was a founding trustee of the Maimonides Foundation in 1985 and in 2004 he founded Alif-Aleph UK (British Muslims and British Jews).

He is an Honorary Fellow and Inter Faith Patron of the Woolf Institute, a Centre for Muslim-Jewish Relations at the University of Cambridge and a visiting fellow in the criminology department of the University of Westminster.

Stephen Lawrence Inquiry 

In the 'Stephen Lawrence Inquiry' into racism in policing from 1997–99, Stone was appointed to the panel of the Stephen Lawrence Inquiry, which was led by Sir William Macpherson. In 2013 he published the book Hidden Stories of the Stephen Lawrence Inquiry, documenting his personal experience on the Inquiry and raising concerns about the way the Inquiry was managed. In 2003/04 he sat on the panel of the NHS David Bennett Inquiry.

In 2010 Stone was awarded an OBE for "public and voluntary" service.

See also
 Anthony Lester, Baron Lester of Herne Hill
 Jim Rose (journalist)

References

External links 
 Richard Stone
 Hidden Stories

1937 births
Living people
English Jews
British anti-racism activists
Hate crimes
Jewish anti-racism activists
Racially motivated violence in England
Racism in the United Kingdom
Officers of the Order of the British Empire